The Sixteenth Legislative Assembly of Bihar (Sixteenth Vidhan Sabha of Bihar) was constituted on 20 November 2015 as a result of Bihar Legislative Assembly election, 2015 held between 12 October to 5 November 2015. The Legislative Assembly has total of 243 MLAs.

Legislative Assembly

Constituencies

References

Bihar Legislative Assembly